Clyde Henry Williams (April 9, 1920 – June 5, 2005) was an American Negro league pitcher for the Cleveland Buckeyes in 1947.

A native of Clarksdale, Mississippi, Williams served as a military police officer during World War II, and played with the Buckeyes during their 1947 Negro American League championship season. He died in Detroit, Michigan in 2005 at age 85.

References

External links
 and Seamheads
 Clyde Williams at Negro Leagues Baseball Museum

1920 births
2005 deaths
Cleveland Buckeyes players
Sportspeople from Clarksdale, Mississippi
Baseball players from Mississippi
Baseball pitchers
20th-century African-American sportspeople
21st-century African-American people